Hua Sai is a district (amphoe) in the southeastern part of Nakhon Si Thammarat province, southern Thailand.

Geography
Neighboring districts are (from the south clockwise): Ranot of Songkhla province; Khuan Khanun and Pa Phayom of Phatthalung province; Cha-uat, Chian Yai, and Pak Phanang of Nakhon Si Thammarat Province. To the east is the Gulf of Thailand.

History
The district was established in 1904, then named Khao Phang Krai (เขาพังไกร), as the administrative center was in tambon Khao Phang Krai. When the center was moved in 1906 to tambon Hua Sai, the district was renamed accordingly. In 1924 the district was reduced to a minor district (king amphoe) under Pak Phanang district. In the same year the district office was moved to its present location in village eight of tambon Hua Sai. In 1937 the district regained full district status.

Administration
The district is divided into 11 sub-districts (tambons), which are further subdivided into 99 villages (mubans). Hua Sai is a township (thesaban tambon) which covers parts of tambons Hua Sai and Na Saton. There are a further 11 tambon administrative organizations (TAO).

References

External links
amphoe.com
http://www.huasai.go.th Hua Sai TAO (Thai)

Districts of Nakhon Si Thammarat province